Enga Mioks (established 1992) is a semi-professional rugby league team based in Enga Province, Papua New Guinea. The team competes in the Papua New Guinea National Rugby League competition. They play at Johnson Siki Aipus Oval, Wabag located at 3 km outside the provincial capital Wabag.

History 
The team qualified for the SP Inter-city Cup in its 1998 season. In their maiden season they came a miserable second-last. The following season under new coaching staff and new sponsors Toyota they improved significantly coming fourth. In their third season with the smart recruiting of power-house international prop Raymond Karl the Mioks won their first minor premiership and SP Intercity Millennium Cup title in 2000. Ever since then the team has had a wayward time with financial problems and provincial problems. 
Entering the new PNGNRL competition on 2005 they had a scrappy season finishing a lonely second last. In 2006, however they improved just missing out on the finals play off by points difference.

2022 squad

Honours
 Cambridge Cup Club Champions: 1995, 1996, 1997
 SP Cup/Bemobile Cup/PNGNRL:
Champions (1): 2000
Runner-Up (2): 2009, 2018
 Finishes in top 5 every season

See also

References

External links
www.lbcbombers.com.pg
www.thenational.com.pg
www.postcourier.com.pg

Papua New Guinean rugby league teams
Rugby clubs established in 1992
1992 establishments in Papua New Guinea